John Crerar (September 22, 1848 – October 21, 1933) was a lawyer and political figure in Manitoba. He represented Minnedosa from 1881 to 1883 in the Legislative Assembly of Manitoba as a Liberal.

He was born in Perth County, Ontario and was educated in Stratford, at Upper Canada College and at the University of Toronto. Crerar was called to the Ontario bar in 1877. After practising law in Ontario, he came west in 1879, settling in Minnedosa, Manitoba in May 1880. Crerar was called to the Manitoba bar in 1881. In 1899, he married Ida May Porteous. Crerar was the first mayor of Minnedosa. He also practised law in Birtle with Charles Mickle and in Melita. He was elected to the Manitoba assembly in an 1881 by-election held after the western boundary of Manitoba was adjusted. Crerar did not run for reelection in 1883 but was defeated when he ran for reelection in 1886 and 1899. He retired in 1928 and moved to California, later dying in Long Beach.

References

1848 births
1933 deaths
Manitoba Liberal Party MLAs
Mayors of places in Manitoba